Wimbledon Cricket Club Ground is a cricket ground in Wimbledon, London.  The ground is located opposite the All England Lawn Tennis and Croquet Club, famous for hosting the Wimbledon Championships.

The first recorded match on the ground was in 1891, when Wimbledon played Marlborough Blues.  In constant use from 1891 to the present day, the ground has also hosted several Second XI Championship fixtures for the Surrey Second XI.  The ground has held a single List-A match, which came in the 1999 NatWest Trophy and was between the Surrey Cricket Board and Cheshire.

In local domestic cricket, the venue is the home ground of Wimbledon Cricket Club who play in the Surrey Championship.  The club has used the ground since 1854.

References

External links
Wimbledon Cricket Club Ground on CricketArchive
Wimbledon Cricket Club Ground on Cricinfo

Cricket grounds in London
Cricket grounds in Surrey
Sports venues completed in 1854
1854 establishments in England